Pioneer Hotel may refer to:

Pioneer Hotel (Tucson, Arizona)
Pioneer Hotel (Maui, Hawaii), also known as Pioneer Inn
Pioneer Hotel & Gambling Hall, formerly Colorado Club, a hotel and casino in Laughlin, Nevada